XHPGUA-FM is a radio station on 91.1 FM in Guachochi, Chihuahua, Mexico. It is known as La Magia del Amor.

History
XHPGUA-FM was awarded in the IFT-4 radio auction of 2017 alongside XHPCHO-FM.

The stations began transmissions on September 11, 2017, with a formal inauguration on September 27 attended by Governor Javier Corral.

In 2022, the station changed its branding to "La Magia del Amor".

References

Radio stations in Chihuahua
Radio stations established in 2017
2017 establishments in Mexico